Annemie Anne Francine Coenen (born 14 July 1978 in Herk-de-Stad) is a Belgian singer and songwriter who was in the duo  AnnaGrace (formerly known as Ian Van Dahl).

Life
Coenen sang in school musical comedies and choral in Antwerp. She joined a dance band at the age of 17. She hoped to become a fashion designer, and aimed to enter a fashion school at Antwerp. To this end, she worked a variety of odd jobs around Antwerp. One of her friends invited her to Ibiza where she found the dance scene.

When she did return to Belgium, Coenen recorded a demo which she said was mainly "just for fun." However, the demo came to the attention of Stefan Wuyts, representing the A&R label, who was looking for a mime artist for a song called "Castles in the Sky" which was meant to be part of a new Belgian project called Ian Van Dahl. Since her joining the group in 2001, it has sold four million CDs and singles worldwide. She was the main vocalist on the albums Ace and Lost and Found.

In June 2008, Coenen and Luts teamed together to create their own trance music project called AnnaGrace. 

Since March 2014, Coenen has had her own fashion line named Gracenatic.

Discography

Albums
 Ace
 Lost and Found
 (AnnaGrace) Ready to Dare

Singles
 Ian Van Dahl:
 2000 "Castles in the Sky"
 2001 "Secret Love"
 2001 "Will I?"
 2002 "Reason"
 2002 "Try"
 2003 "I Can't Let You Go"
 2004 "Where Are You Now?"
 2004 "Believe"
 2004 "Inspiration"
 2005 "Movin' On"
 2006 "Just a Girl"
 AnnaGrace:
 2008 "You Make Me Feel"
 2009 "Let the Feelings Go"
 2009 "Love Keeps Calling"
 2010 "Celebration"
 2011 "Don't Let Go"
 2012 "Ready to Fall in Love"
 2012 "Alive"
 2013 "Girls Like Dancing"

References

External links 
 Official Annagrace site
 Official Gracenatic site

1978 births
Living people
Belgian songwriters
Women in electronic music
English-language singers from Belgium
Trance singers
21st-century Belgian women singers
21st-century Belgian singers